Memories is the fifth studio LP album by The Vogues, released by Reprise Records in 1969 under catalog number RS 6347.

The album was reissued, combined with their 1970 album, The Vogues Sing the Good Old Songs, on compact disc by Taragon Records on November 6, 2001.

Track listing

External links

1969 albums
The Vogues albums
Reprise Records albums